Earl of Newcastle-upon-Tyne is a title that has been created twice. The first creation came in the Peerage of England in 1623 in favour of Ludovic Stewart, 2nd Duke of Lennox. He was made Duke of Richmond at the same time. For information on this creation, see the Duke of Lennox. It became extinct when the first holder died in 1624. The second creation came in the Peerage of England in 1628 in favour of William Cavendish, 1st Viscount Mansfield. He was later created Marquess of Newcastle-upon-Tyne and Duke of Newcastle-upon-Tyne. For more information on this creation, see the latter title.

Earls of Newcastle-upon-Tyne, First creation (1623)
see the Duke of Lennox

Earls of Newcastle-upon-Tyne, Second creation (1628)
see the Duke of Newcastle-upon-Tyne

References
Kidd, Charles, Williamson, David (editors). Debrett's Peerage and Baronetage (1990 edition). New York: St Martin's Press, 1990.

Extinct earldoms in the Peerage of England
Noble titles created in 1623
Noble titles created in 1628